Gezim Gashi (born 29 June 1990), is a Swedish Entrepreneur with roots from Kosovo. He achieved success with his covers on YouTube, which later were removed due to copyright issues. In 2011, he moved to Los Angeles to pursue his music career.

.

References

External links 
Gashi's official website

1990 births
Kosovo Albanians
Living people
Musicians from Pristina
Swedish pop singers
Swedish rhythm and blues singers
Swedish people of Kosovan descent
Kosovan emigrants to Sweden
21st-century Swedish male singers